(January 6, 1945 - November 29, 2020) was a Japanese politician of the New Komeito Party who served as a member of the House of Councillors in the Diet (national legislature) from 1992 to 2010.

She was born in Taipei, Taiwan (then under Japanese administration) and graduated from Keio University in 1967. She passed the bar examination on her third attempt in 1969 and was admitted to the bar in 1972.

She was elected for the first time in 1992 as a representative of Tokyo in the House of Councillors. In the 2004 election she switched to the national proportional representation slate. From January to November 1998, she served as the president of the New Komeito Party. She announced her retirement from politics at the end of 2009, which became effective following the 2010 election.

In 2002, she proposed a bill to create an enhanced version of life imprisonment for serious offenses, with the ultimate goal of sparking debate about the abolition of the death penalty in Japan.

She was co-managing partner of the law firm of Hamayotsu & Hamayotsu in Kojimachi, Tokyo. In 2011, she became an adjunct professor of law at Soka University.

On February 16, 2023, Komeito announced that Hamayotsu died in November 2020 at age 75.

References

External links 
 

Government ministers of Japan
Members of the House of Councillors (Japan)
Women government ministers of Japan
Female members of the House of Councillors (Japan)
Japanese women lawyers
Keio University alumni
Politicians from Taipei
1945 births
Living people
New Komeito politicians
20th-century Japanese lawyers
21st-century Japanese lawyers
20th-century women lawyers
21st-century women lawyers
Members of Sōka Gakkai